I Don't Watch TV is an Indian sitcom web series which premiered on 15 April 2016 and stream on Arré and YouTube. This show is produced by Nakuul Mehta, Alekh Sangal and Ajay Singh. This web series is based on the real life of the Indian television actors and actresses. The show starring Nakuul, Alekh, Ram and other twenty one total actors and actresses.

Cast

Main
 Nakuul Mehta as himself
 Ram Menon as himself
 Alekh Sangal as himself

Recurring
 Jankee Parekh as herself
 Drashti Dhami as herself
 Disha Parmar as herself
 Dilnaz Irani as Madam
 Rithvik Dhanjani as himself
 Karan Wahi as himself
 Ridhi Dogra herself
 Karan Patel as himself
 Kritika Kamra herself
 Rita Bhaduri as Baa
 Tanuja Chaturvedi as Nakuul's mother
 Anirudh Dave as himself
 Sanaya Irani as herself
 Aneri Vajani as Tulsi
 Bhupesh Singh as Kranti Sharma
 Mukesh Chhabra as himself 
 Arjun as himself
 Sana Sheikh herself
 Aruna Sangal as herself
 K.C. Shankar as himself

Episodes

References

External links
 I Don't Watch TV streaming on Arré

Hindi-language web series
2010s YouTube series
2016 web series debuts
Indian comedy web series
Television in fiction